The Junkman Is a 1982 independent film which spent two years in production. To make the film, H. B. Halicki used his own personal collection of over 200 cars, toys, and guns—including Eleanor, the star of his 1974 cult classic Gone in 60 Seconds.

The Junkman is the second installment of Halicki's film trilogy. It presents Gone in 60 Seconds and Deadline Auto Theft as films within a film. The opening car chase sequence, which involves a 1974 Bricklin SV-1, is part of Deadline Auto Thefts storyline.

The Junkman holds the Guinness World Record for wrecking over 150 cars, trucks, motorcycles and planes in one movie.

Plot
Harlan B. Hollis struggles to stay alive when a jealous public relations manager hires a team of assassins to kill him. The manager, also Hollis' brother-in-law, resents Hollis for making the movie Gone in 60 Seconds, which is premiering at the Cinerama Dome.

The film starts with the head hitman Frank Spyros answering a pay phone and getting instructions from a then unknown person to go ahead with a hit on Hollis as he drives to the James Dean Festival in Cholame, California. The same unknown person plays a video highlighting Hollis's life. He ejects the video and crumples up a publicity shot of Hollis.

Later, Hollis is shown a picture found in the burned wreckage of one of the air covers' planes. Hollis identifies it as an unreleased publicity shot, indicating someone from inside of his own company is trying to kill him.

With the aid of the Goodyear Blimp, he travels to the Cinerama Dome, where the premiere is being held. He discovers the mystery man to be Fox, who subsequently slips off the edge of the theater roof. Clark's crew find the bomb in the limo, throw it into a parking lot, and it explodes, blowing up several cars in the process.

At the end of the film, Hollis gives his daughter Kelly a new 1982 Pontiac Trans Am for her birthday.

Cast 

Many locals were used as extras in the movie. Most of the San Luis Obispo County sheriff deputies, Paso Robles, and Atascadero police officers in the movie were officers at the time of filming. All of the California Highway Patrol officers were professional stunt drivers. Hoyt Axton makes a special appearance as "Captain Gibbs"; his character would play a much larger role in Halicki's next film, Deadline Auto Theft (1983).

Home media
In 2001, Denice Shakarian Halicki, along with her business partner Michael Leone under the banner Halicki Films, released the restored film in Dolby 5.1 surround sound on DVD and VHS to American viewers. It included H. B. Halicki hosting a documentary about film making. In the DVD release, all of the rock and roll, country music soundtrack from the original film including title tracks have been replaced by a generic synthesizer music score. A number of dialogue changes were also made. The original version was released on video in the 1980s but is rare today.

External links
 
 
 

1982 films
1982 action films
1980s crime drama films
American action films
American action comedy films
American chase films
Films about automobiles
Films set in Los Angeles
Films shot in Los Angeles
American independent films
American crime drama films
Films directed by H. B. Halicki
Metafictional works
1982 drama films
1980s English-language films
1980s American films